Joshua Brendan David Magennis (born 15 August 1990) is a Northern Irish footballer who plays as a striker for Wigan Athletic. Having spent the majority of his youth career as a goalkeeper, he switched to striker in 2008 before turning professional in 2009. Magennis has previously played for Cardiff City, Grimsby Town, Aberdeen, St Mirren, Kilmarnock, Charlton Athletic, Bolton Wanderers and Hull City.

Club career

Early career
Magennis began his career as an outfield player, playing up front, even representing County Down in the Milk Cup as a youngster, before eventually becoming a goalkeeper. He was a member of the Glentoran youth team before joining the youth team at Cardiff City.

Cardiff City
On 31 October 2007, Cardiff met Liverpool in the Football League Cup but, with David Forde and on-loan goalkeeper Kasper Schmeichel ineligible, Magennis took a spot on the bench for the match. The decision to include Magennis was controversial because he had been called up to the Northern Ireland under-19 team but was not allowed to join the squad by manager Dave Jones due to the need to keep the youngster at Cardiff, with only one senior goalkeeper available for the match. In April 2008 he reverted to playing as a striker, just before the Welsh Youth Cup final where he came on as a substitute.

Magennis signed his first professional contract on 10 April 2009 for Cardiff City, the only second year academy student to be offered a professional deal, and began working with reserve team coach Paul Wilkinson who had previously coached former Cardiff striker Cameron Jerome in a similar manner. On 8 August 2009, Magennis made his professional debut when he replaced Jay Bothroyd as a late substitute on the opening day of the 2009–10 season in a 4–0 win over Scunthorpe United. In his fourth appearance for the club, Magennis scored his first professional goal during a 3–1 win over Bristol Rovers in the second round of the League Cup.

The return of Ross McCormack and Warren Feeney from injury meant that Magennis fell down the pecking order at Cardiff and he was allowed to join League Two side Grimsby Town on a one-month loan deal on 15 October 2009 He made his debut against Rochdale on 17 October 2009, which was to be the last game managed by Mike Newell, who was sacked the following morning. Magennis made just one more appearance for the side before, on 29 October 2009, he was told that he and fellow loanee Arnaud Mendys loan contracts were to be terminated ahead of schedule. Caretaker manager Neil Woods commented that "As the caretaker manager I think I need to be fair to the players that we've got here first. They've been a little bit of a victim of the circumstances of the last two weeks. They are not going to get in the eighteen and I don't think it is fair to keep loan players here."

Magennis made his first start for Cardiff on 9 January 2010 in a 1–1 draw with Blackpool, but was forced off after just 35 minutes after suffering a fractured fibula. He made his comeback as a substitute on the last day of the regular season against Derby County. He was given a free transfer by Cardiff at the end of the season along with Peter Enckelman, Warren Feeney, Tony Capaldi and Aaron Morris.

Aberdeen
On 5 July 2010, Magennis signed a deal with Aberdeen, on their first day of pre-season training. After signing for the club, Magennis said he was looking forward to developing at the club and that he believed that then-manager Mark McGhee could help him become a better striker.

He started in Aberdeen's first game of the 2010–11 season at home to Hamilton Academical, where he hit the crossbar in a 4–0 win and played 90 minutes. On 6 November 2010, Magennis scored an own goal during a 9–0 defeat against Celtic, the scoreline was the biggest win in the SPL and also the biggest defeat in the history of Aberdeen. He scored his first goal for the Dons on 8 January 2011, the final goal of their 6–0 Scottish Cup win over Second Division club East Fife and also set up a goal for Scott Vernon. One month later, Magennis scored his first league goal in a 5–0 victory over Kilmarnock on 19 February 2011. Later in the season, Magennis scored against Dundee United (3–1 loss) and Hibernian (3–1 win) during the final games of the season.

In the pre-season friendly against German side Borussia Mönchengladbach, which Aberdeen lost 5–2, Magennis scored from 45 yards. After the match, Magennis then criticised the referee Max Ebbels for errors he'd made during the match. He came on as a substitute in Aberdeen's first game of the 2011–12 season at home to St Johnstone in a 0–0 draw. Magennis scored his first goal of the season in a 3–3 draw against Dunfermline Athletic on 26 November 2011. Soon in January, Magennis was told by the club's management to look for a new club, but nothing happened in the transfer window. Magennis then vowed to try and earn a new contract. Towards the end of season, Magennis played in the right back position, He said about playing in this position: "I feel more comfortable because the game is in front of me and I'm able to dictate play with overlaps and what passes I'm picking. It's good for my football knowledge. I'm able to read the game better so it's a better position for me." At the end of the 2011/12 season, Magennis signed a contract extension at Aberdeen, to run until the end of the 2012–13 season.

In the 2012–13 season, Magennis continued to play at right back after Rory McArdle left the club. On 23 September 2012, Magennis scored his first goal of the season, in injury time in a 3–3 draw against Motherwell. His impressive performance caught the attention of the club's legend Billy Williamson who said he believed Magennis can achieve same the level of success at the club that he did. Soon after scoring his first goal of the season, Manager Craig Brown began negotiating with Magennis to sign a new contract. Due to the club's injury crisis, Magennis said he was willing to play in any position if any players suffered an injury. On 27 November 2012, Magennis scored a brace in a 3–2 loss against Inverness Caledonian Thistle and on 16 March 2013, scored a brace in a 4–3 loss against Celtic. After the match, Craig Brown was confident that Magennis would sign a new contract at the club. Magennis, himself, said he was aiming to sign a new contract. Eventually, at the end of the season, Magennis was the only out of contract player to be offered a new deal as thirteen players were released and he signed one-year deal to stay with the club.

The following 2013–14 season, Magennis started mostly coming on as a substitute and it wasn't until on 14 September 2013 when he scored his first goal of the season, in a 3–0 win over Partick Thistle. However, his season was overshadowed by his knee injury, forcing him to undergo surgery. At the end of the 2013–14 season, Magennis was released by the club. Upon his release, he was linked with a move to Scotland and England.

St Mirren (loan)
On 30 January 2014, it was announced that Magennis signed a loan deal with St Mirren until the end of season 2013–14. Magennis made thirteen appearances for the club, scoring zero goals, before his loan spell came to an end.

Kilmarnock
Magennis signed a three-year contract with Kilmarnock in July 2014. He made his debut on 9 August 2014, in a 1–1 draw with Dundee and scored his first goal on 16 August 2014, as Kilmarnock won 2–1 away at Ross County. Magennis went on to start every single league game of his first season scoring eight goals.

In February 2016, Magennis, was the subject of racist abuse from Hearts supporters at their Tynecastle ground in Edinburgh. A statement from Hearts clarified that Magennis had been abused because he is Northern Irish, not because he is black.

On 6 August 2016, Kilmarnock announced they had turned down an offer of £100,000 possibly rising to £200,000 for Magennis from Charlton Athletic. Earlier that day he had been left out of Kilmarnock's squad to play Motherwell, with manager Lee Clark saying Magennis had told him he "didn't feel right for today's game." Earlier in the week, Kilmarnock had also rejected a bid from Oldham Athletic.

Charlton Athletic
On 11 August 2016, Magennis joined League One side Charlton Athletic on a two-year deal. He scored his first goal for the club in a 2–2 draw with Fleetwood Town on 10 September 2016. On 2 January 2017, Magennis bagged a hat-trick against Bristol Rovers, his first in English football.

Bolton Wanderers
On 30 July 2018, Magennis joined Bolton Wanderers for an undisclosed fee later revealed to be £200,000. This was Bolton's first cash signing in three and a half years. He made his debut on the opening day of the season, 4 August, starting against newly relegated West Bromwich Albion and opened the scoring in the 18th minute. Bolton went on to win the game 2–1. He scored for the second game in a row, scoring Bolton's second in a 2–2 home draw against Bristol City on 11 August. He scored a hat-trick in the FA Cup third round in a 5–2 win against Walsall on 5 January 2019.

Hull City
On 8 August 2019, Magennis joined Hull City on a two-year deal. Magennis made his first appearance for Hull City in the first round of the EFL Cup in the 0–3 away win against Tranmere Rovers. In April 2021, after scoring six goals in the month, Magennis was awarded the League One Player of the Month award, a month that finished with Hull achieving promotion back to the Championship with a 2–1 victory over Lincoln City, a match where Magennis opened the scoring. On 18 May 2021, the club announced that they had exercised the option of a one-year contract extension for Magennis.

Wigan Athletic
On 13 January 2022, Magennis joined Wigan Athletic on a two-and-a-half-year deal, for an undisclosed fee. He scored his first goal for the club on 15 March 2022 in a 2-0 win against Crewe Alexandra.

International career
While still playing as a goalkeeper, Magennis featured twice for the Northern Ireland Under-17 side, in a 2–0 defeat to Scotland and as a substitute in a 1–0 defeat to the Netherlands. His step up to the under-19 side came following his change of position and he was handed his debut on 8 October 2008 in 3–1 defeat to Serbia under-19's. In July 2009, Magennis helped Northern Ireland retain their Milk Cup crown, scoring the first goal in their 2–0 final victory against Denmark.

On 11 August 2009, Magennis made his debut for the Under-21 side, playing in a 2–1 defeat to Portugal. He grabbed his first two goals for the Under-21 side after coming off the bench in their 6–2 defeat to Iceland on 8 September 2009.

He made his full debut for Northern Ireland on 26 May 2010 against Turkey in a friendly.

On 8 October 2015, Magennis scored his first international goal in a 3–1 defeat of Greece at Windsor Park which ensured Northern Ireland's qualification for UEFA Euro 2016, the country's first appearance at an international tournament in 30 years.

Personal life
Magennis was born in Bangor, County Down. His uncle Mark was also a footballer who played for Ballymena United, Linfield and Bangor. Magennis revealed he once nearly quit football for rugby after struggling as a goalkeeper before eventually switching position to striker. On 28 January 2013, Magennis became a father after his girlfriend, Amy, gave birth to a son.

Career statistics

Club

International

Scores and results list Northern Ireland's goal tally first.

Honours 
Hull City
 EFL League One: 2020–21

Wigan Athletic
 EFL League One: 2021–22 

Individual
 EFL League One Player of the Month: April 2021

References

External links

1990 births
Living people
People from Bangor, County Down
Association footballers from Northern Ireland
Association football goalkeepers
Association football forwards
Association football utility players
Cardiff City F.C. players
Grimsby Town F.C. players
Aberdeen F.C. players
English Football League players
Scottish Premier League players
Scottish Professional Football League players
Northern Ireland under-21 international footballers
Black British sportsmen
Northern Ireland international footballers
Lisburn Distillery F.C. players
Glentoran F.C. players
Northern Ireland youth international footballers
St Mirren F.C. players
Kilmarnock F.C. players
Charlton Athletic F.C. players
Bolton Wanderers F.C. players
Hull City A.F.C. players
Wigan Athletic F.C. players
UEFA Euro 2016 players
Black Irish sportspeople